"Rainy Dayz" is a song by American singer Mary J. Blige featuring additional vocals from rapper Ja Rule. Taken from Blige's re-release of her fifth studio album, No More Drama, the track was released to coincide with the release of the album's reissue, serving as its final single. The Irv Gotti-produced duet became another hit for both, peaking at number 12 on the Billboard Hot 100 and number 17 in the United Kingdom.

Background
Ja Rule wrote "Rainy Dayz" in response to the September 11 attacks in his home city of New York. He told Complex, "I went in my basement in my studio and put that record together because that’s how I was feeling about the situation. I felt like the nation—us as a country, us as people—we were going through a rainy day. It will pass but today this is what it is. Speaking to TRL, he said, "It’s basically about how we feel going through life. But [in] these times, especially right now [with] what’s going on, it kind of fits. On the record, I’m basically saying that it’s these rainy days that we spend a lifetime trying to wash away. Just waiting for the sun to come and shine again. But until then, come smile for me. So that’s the kind of vibe that [the song] is on.

The track was originally written for TLC for their fourth studio album 3D, but the group turned the track down. Group member Tionne Watkins commented on this, saying "It wasn't that I didn't like the song, it was more so that I felt like I've already been there, done that, and I was just on another page at the time". References to TLC being the group in mind when the track was written can be heard in the lyrics "We’re always livin’ so crazy and sexy and cool" (in reference to their album CrazySexyCool) and "Baby didn’t we tell you before about chasin’ those waterfalls" (in reference to their 1995 single "Waterfalls"). The track also has a reference to the Marvin Gaye song "What's Going On."

Track listings
CD 1
 "Rainy Dayz" (featuring Ja Rule) (album version)
 "Rainy Dayz" (featuring Ja Rule) (Thunderpuss radio edit)
 "Rainy Dayz" (featuring Ja Rule) (Thunderpuss club mix)
 "Rainy Dayz" (featuring Ja Rule) (Thunderdub)

CD 2
 "Rainy Dayz" (featuring Ja Rule) (Thunderpuss Remix)
 "Let No Man Put Asunder" (Maurice Joshua Remix)
 "Sexy" (featuring Jadakiss)

Charts

Weekly charts

Year-end charts

Release history

References

2002 songs
Ja Rule songs
Male–female vocal duets
Mary J. Blige songs
Songs written by Irv Gotti
Songs written by Ja Rule